is the third single by Japanese entertainer Miho Nakayama. Written by Takashi Matsumoto and Kyōhei Tsutsumi, the single was released on December 5, 1985, by King Records.

Background and release
"Be-Bop High School" was the theme song of the Toei film of the same name, which starred Nakayama. The song was arranged with the incorporation of a steel guitar riff.

"Be-Bop High School" peaked at No. 4 on Oricon's weekly singles chart and sold over 179,000 copies, becoming Nakayama's first top-five hit.

Track listing

Charts
Weekly charts

Year-end charts

References

External links

1985 singles
1985 songs
Japanese-language songs
Miho Nakayama songs
Songs with lyrics by Takashi Matsumoto (lyricist)
Songs with music by Kyōhei Tsutsumi
King Records (Japan) singles